Eilat's Coral Beach Nature Reserve and Conservation area is a nature reserve and national park in the Red Sea, near the city of Eilat in Israel. It is popular for diving and research, and was founded by the Israel Nature and Parks Authority. At the southernmost point of the nature reserve there is the Coral World Underwater Observatory, the first of its kind in the world, and the largest public aquarium in the Middle East. It was listed as one of The New York Times' Places to Go in 2019.

References

External links

 Eilat Coral Beach Nature Reserve

Nature reserves in Israel
Landforms of the Red Sea
Eilat
Coral reefs